The Araguaia River (Karajá: ♂ Berohokỹ [beɾohoˈkə̃], ♀ Bèrakuhukỹ [bɛɾakuhuˈkə̃]) is one of the major rivers of Brazil though it is almost equal in volume at its confluence with the Tocantins. It has a total length of approximately 2,627 km.

Geography
The Araguaia River comes from Goiás-Mato Grosso south borders. From there it flows northeast to a junction with the Tocantins near the town of São João.

Along its course, the river forms the border between the states of Goiás, Mato Grosso, Tocantins and Pará. Roughly in the middle of its course the Araguaia splits into two forks (with the western one retaining the name Araguaia and the eastern one being called the Javaés River). These later reunite, forming the Ilha do Bananal, the world's largest river island. The vein of the Javaés forms a broad inland where it pours back into the main Araguaia, a 100,000 hectare expanse of igapós or flooded forest, blackwater river channels, and oxbow lakes called Cantão, protected by the Cantão State Park. It is one of the biologically richest areas of the eastern Amazon, with over 700 species of birds, nearly 300 species of fish, large populations of species such as the giant otter, the black caiman, the pirarucú, one of the world's largest freshwater fish, and the Araguaian river dolphin (or Araguaian boto), all occurring within a large area.

A large portion of the Araguaia's course is navigable all year, but the river below the Cantão wetlands is interrupted by rapids.

The middle and lower basin of the river is in the Xingu–Tocantins–Araguaia moist forests ecoregion.
The combined watershed of Araguaia and Tocantins rivers (named the Araguaia Tocantins Basin) covers approximately 9.5% of Brazil's national territory. This area is an integral part of the Amazon biome; however, the Araguaia River is not a tributary of the Amazon.

"Araguaia" means "River of the macaws" in the native Tupi language.

Tributaries

Its principal tributary is the Rio das Mortes, which rises in the Serra de São Jerônimo, near Cuiabá, Mato Grosso, and is navigable to Pará.
Other important tributaries include the Bonito, Garcas, Tapirape and the Formoso or Cristalino on the west, and the Pitombas, Claro, Vermelho, Tucupa and Chavante on the east.

History

It was explored in part by Henri Coudreau in 1897. From 1972 to 1974 this region was the scene of a conflict between left-wing guerrilla movements and forces supporting the then military dictatorship.

Towns
Among the most important settlements on the banks of the Araguaia River are (in a downstream order):
 Barra do Garças
 Aragarças
 Aruanã
 Luiz Alves
 São Félix do Araguaia
 Santa Terezinha
 Araguacema
 Conceição do Araguaia
 Xambioá
 São Geraldo do Araguaia
 São João do Araguaia

Tourism

Several parts of the river's course are protected by national parks and other reserves like the Emas National Park and the Araguaia National Park. The Araguaia has "beaches" - bright sandy banks that seam the stream from May to October.

Deforestation and Impacts on the Araguaia
Deforestation and expansion of cattle ranching and agriculture in the Araguaia basin has been extreme during the last four decades. As a consequence, strong linear erosion has produced thousand of gullies just in the upper Araguaia basin, and the river mainstem suffered strong sedimentation and fluvial metamorphism (changes in its channel pattern).

See also
List of rivers of Goiás
South Amazon Ecotones Ecological Corridor
Deforestation

References

External links
Rio Araguaia (information for tourists in Portuguese, Spanish and English)
Hotel, turismo, pescaria, passeios ecológicos Araguaia,Luiz Alves, Bananal, Cristalino
hydrographic information (in Portuguese)
Basin map (in Portuguese)
Tocantins state, with Rivers v-Brazil.com
Pará state, with Rivers v-Brazil.com
Instituto Araguaia
Brazilian Ministry of Transport

Rivers of Mato Grosso
Rivers of Tocantins
Rivers of Pará
Tributaries of the Amazon River
Rivers of Goiás